Jouac is a commune in the Haute-Vienne department in the Nouvelle-Aquitaine region in west-central France.

Geography
The river Benaize forms part of the commune's eastern border, flows through the commune, crossing the village of Jouac, then forms part of the commune's north-western border.

Inhabitants are known as Jouacais in French.

See also
Communes of the Haute-Vienne department

References

Communes of Haute-Vienne